The Signum Quartet is a string quartet based in Bremen, Germany. Founded in 1994, it has been playing in the current formation since 2016.

Concert and festival appearances
The Signum Quartet has appeared at the Wigmore Hall in London, the Cité de la Musique in Paris, at the Berliner Philharmonie, the Amsterdam Concertgebouw, the Hamburg Laeiszhalle, the Liederhalle Stuttgart, the Philharmonie Essen and the Beethoven-Haus Bonn and has been invited to the Schleswig-Holstein Music Festival, the Rheingau Music Festival, Aldeburgh Festival of Music
the BBC Proms and the Festival Aix-en-Provence.

At the invitation of the Goethe Institute, the quartet has undertaken extended concert tours which have hitherto seen them perform in Asia, Middle America and Africa.

Their album ‘No.3’ (released in May 2013) with quartets by Bartók, Schnittke and Berg was announced as the winner of the chamber music category of the International Classical Music Awards 2014.

Concerts by the four musicians have been broadcast nationally and internationally by stations of the ARD, Deutschlandfunk, DRS, ORF, BBC and Arte.<ref>[//www.wdr3.de/musik/kammermusikbeiwdr3/signumquartett106.html WDR 3 Kammerkonzerte NRW – Signum Quartett]. Website of WDR 3, 13  April 2013, retrieved on 14 October 2013</ref>

From 2009–2012 it was supported by the stART Programme of the Bayer Cultural Affairs Department (Bayer Kultur) and from 2011–2013 was named a BBC Radio 3 New Generation Artist.

Members
 Florian Donderer (violin; until 2015 Kerstin Dill)
 Annette Walther (violin)
 Xandi van Dijk (viola)
 Thomas Schmitz (violoncello)

Artistic development
Intensive studies with the Alban Berg Quartet, the Artemis Quartet and the Melos Quartet as well as masterclasses and co-operations with György Kurtág, Tabea Zimmermann, Walter Levin, Alfred Brendel, Jörg Widmann, Leon Fleisher i.a.

Chamber music studies at the Staatliche Hochschule für Musik und darstellende Kunst Stuttgart, Hochschule für Musik und Tanz Köln, Instituto International de Música de Cámara of the Escuela Superior de Música Reina Sofía in Madrid, Hochschule für Musik und Theater Leipzig (Tutorium).

Awards and recognition
Opus Klassik (2019)
International Classical Music Awards (2014)
BBC New Generation Artists (2011–2013)
stART-Programme Bayer Kultur (2009–2012)
International Chamber Music Competition, Hamburg (2009)
London International String Quartet Competition (2009)
Premio Paolo Borciani, Reggio Emilia (2008)Sonderpreis Zonta International
Deutscher Musikwettbewerb (2004)Sonderpreis of the Rheingau Musik Festival (2000)

Recordings
Schubert – Ins stille Land. PENTATONE PTC 5186732 (2020)
Schubert – Aus der Ferne. PENTATONE PTC 5186673 (2018)alla czeca: Antonín Dvořák – String Quartet in G major, op.106, Erwin Schulhoff – Five Pieces for String Quartet (1923), Josef Suk – Meditation on the Old Czech Chorale ’St. Wenceslaus’ op. 35a, Capriccio (2015)soundescapes:  Claude Debussy – String Quartet in G minor, op. 10, Thomas Adès – Arcadiana, Maurice Ravel – String Quartet in F major, Capriccio (2015)No 3:  Alban Berg – String Quartet op. 3, Béla Bartók – String Quartet No. 3, Alfred Schnittke – String Quartet No. 3, Capriccio (2013)Quartettsätze | Quartet Movements with works by H. Wolf, G. Puccini, C. Orff (premiere recording), C. Ives, W. Rihm, F. Schubert, A. Webern, Capriccio (2011)
Horn Quintets by W.A. Mozart, W.G. Hauff, F.A. Hoffmeister, J.M. Haydn, L.van Beethoven, with Nury Guarnaschelli, horn, Capriccio (2011)
String Quartets No. 1 and 2 by Ludwig Thuille, premiere recording, Capriccio (2010), i.a.

Guest appearances:
Erkki-Sven Tüür – Lost Prayers, ECM (2020)
Jörg Widmann – Viola Concerto, 24 Duos, "Jagdquartett": String Quartet No. 3, Harmonia Mundi (2018)Brahms'': Johannes Brahms – Sonatas for viola and piano, op. 120, Hungarian Dances Nos 4, 5 & 16 arranged for viola and string quartet, with Nils Mönkemeyer, viola and William Youn, piano, Sony Classical (2015)

References

External links
 Signum Quartett
 Konzertdirektion Andrea Hampl
 Capriccio
 BBC Radio 3 New Generation Artists
 Bayer Kultur

German string quartets
Musical groups established in 1994
BBC Radio 3 New Generation Artists